A sail bogey or sail trolley is a wind-driven vehicle that runs along railway tracks.

Examples

Spurn railway
The Spurn railway, built along Spurn Head on the Yorkshire coast of England was built in the First World War and ran until the early 1950s and included sail bogies as part of its rolling stock.

Teesmouth lifeboat
In the early days of the Teesmouth lifeboat, its crew were sometimes able, subject to wind conditions, to travel out to the lifeboat station at South Gare on a sail bogey.

Others

Other locations to have used sail bogies include:
 Cliffe, Kent
 Gosport
 Herne Bay Pier, Kent
 Camber Railway near Port Stanley, The Falkland Islands
 the Dagebüll–Oland–Langeneß island railway, connecting the town of Dagebüll with the Halligen Oland and Langeneß, Germany

Replica

More recently, in 2005, a replica of a 19th-century sail bogey was built and demonstrated on the Ffestiniog Railway in North Wales.

References

Further reading
 

Rolling stock